The following radio stations broadcast on FM frequency 104.3 MHz:

Argentina
 La Hormiga in Rosario, Santa Fe
 Liverpool in Bahía Blanca, Buenos Aires
 LRM424 Platino in Las Rosas, Santa Fe
 LRP759 Ciudad in San Javier, Santa Fe
 LRS341 Red del Plata in Rafaela, Santa Fe

Australia
 ABC Classic FM in Spencer Gulf, South Australia
 3MIL in Mildura, Victoria
 3KKZ in Melbourne, Victoria
 2EEE in Bega, New South Wales
 Radio National in Wagga Wagga, New South Wales
 Radio TAB in Cairns, Queensland
 SBS Radio in Jindabyne, New South Wales

Canada (Channel 282)
 CBFX-FM-1 in Trois-Rivieres, Quebec
 CBGA-FM-17 in New Richmond, Quebec
 CBMY-FM in Riviere-St-Paul, Quebec
 CBNO-FM in Swift Current, Newfoundland and Labrador
 CBNU-FM in Fermeuse, Newfoundland and Labrador
 CBWZ-FM in Fairford, Manitoba
 CFGP-FM-1 in Peace River, Alberta
 CFGP-FM-2 in Tumbler Ridge, Alberta
 CFRQ-FM in Halifax, Nova Scotia
 CHFA-1-FM in Lethbridge, Alberta
 CHGO-FM in Amos/Val d'Or, Quebec
 CHLG-FM in Vancouver, British Columbia
 CIAM-FM-4 in Foggy Mountain, Alberta
 CICN-FM in Marcelin, Saskatchewan
 CJQM-FM in Sault Sainte Marie, Ontario
 CKNX-1-FM in Wingham, Ontario
 CKQV-FM-1 in Dryden, Ontario
 CKUA-FM-14 in Banff, Alberta
 CKWS-FM in Kingston, Ontario
 CKXR-FM-2 in Enderby, British Columbia

China 
 CNR Business Radio in Lhasa

Dominican Republic
 HIMH SONIDO HD in Santiago, Dominican Republic

Indonesia
 Radio Silaturahim in Batam & Singapore

Jamaica
BBC World Service

Malaysia
 Buletin FM in Kuching, Sarawak
 Hot FM in Malacca & North Johor
 Lite in Kota Bharu, Kelantan

Mexico
 XHATV-FM in Álamo Temapache, Veracruz
 XHAZE-FM in Nogales, Sonora
 XHCHP-FM in Chignahuapan, Puebla
 XHCSBI-FM in Chilpancingo, Guerrero
 XHCSBU-FM in San Pedro Mixtepec Distrito 22, Oaxaca
 XHENX-FM in Mazatlán, Sinaloa
 XHERS-FM in Gómez Palacio, Durango
 XHJIM-FM in Ciudad Jiménez, Chihuahua
 XHMCA-FM in Medellín, Veracruz
 XHMK-FM in Huixtla, Chiapas
 XHPTEM-FM in Temax, Yucatán
 XHPUE-FM in Puebla, Puebla
 XHREV-FM in Los Mochis, Sinaloa
 XHROJ-FM in Cancún, Quintana Roo
 XHSCEK-FM in Santiago Tiangistenco, Estado de México
 XHSV-FM in Morelia, Michoacán
 XHTO-FM in Ciudad Juárez, Chihuahua
 XHTZA-FM in Coatzacoalcos, Veracruz
 XHUDG-FM in Guadalajara, Jalisco
 XHUGPV-FM in Puerto Vallarta, Jalisco
 XHVUN-FM in Villa Unión, Coahuila

Philippines
  in Metro Manila
  in Legazpi City
  in Davao City

Turkey
 Radyo Trend in Gebze
 TRT Radyo Haber in Mersin and Balıkesir
 TRT FM in Iğdır

United States (Channel 282)
  in Camp Verde, Arizona
 KAWO in Boise, Idaho
 KBCN-FM in Marshall, Arkansas
  in Kansas City, Missouri
 KBIG in Los Angeles, California
 KBQF in McFarland, California
 KBVP in Olney, Texas
 KCAR-FM in Baxter Springs, Kansas
 KCUW-LP in Pendleton, Oregon
  in Bonne Terre, Missouri
  in Bunkie, Louisiana
 KFNL-FM in Spring Valley, Minnesota
 KFRH in North Las Vegas, Nevada
 KFYN-FM in Detroit, Texas
 KFZE in Daniel, Wyoming
  in Carthage, Texas
 KHCV in Mecca, California
  in Gonzales, California
 KHLK in Brownfield, Texas
 KHMR (FM) in Lovelady, Texas
  in Pullman, Washington
  in Tumon, Guam
 KJHB-LP in Jackson, Wyoming
 KJOI-LP in Biola, California
 KJSS-LP in North Little Rock, Arkansas
 KKFN in Longmont, Colorado
 KKMX in Tri City, Oregon
  in Milbank, South Dakota
  in Breezy Point, Minnesota
  in Taylor, Texas
  in Chehalis, Washington
  in Grand Junction, Colorado
 KNKP-LP in Imperial, Nebraska
  in Kaneohe, Hawaii
 KPOS in Fouke, Arkansas
 KPQG in Goliad, Texas
 KQFX (FM) in Borger, Texas
 KRKN in Eldon, Iowa
 KSHA in Redding, California
 KSOG-LP in Alice, Texas
  in Salt Lake City, Utah
 KTOO in Juneau, Alaska
 KUFA in Hebronville, Texas
 KVGB-FM in Great Bend, Kansas
 KVMO in Vandalia, Missouri
 KXOQ in Kennett, Missouri
  in Davis, California
 KXXU in Santa Anna, Texas
 KZBE in Omak, Washington
 KZBS in Granite, Oklahoma
 KZIO in Two Harbors, Minnesota
  in East Grand Forks, Minnesota
 KZTP in Sibley, Iowa
 WABK-FM in Gardiner, Maine
  in Alma, Georgia
 WAXQ in New York, New York
 WAYI in Charlestown, Indiana
 WAYO-LP in Rochester, New York
  in Augusta, Georgia
 WBMX in Chicago, Illinois
 WBQR-LP in Brookfield, Wisconsin
  in Casey, Illinois
 WCGF-LP in Greer, South Carolina
  in Mount Pleasant, Michigan
 WEYE in Surgoinsville, Tennessee
  in Williamsburg, Kentucky
 WFOX-LP in Sandy Springs, South Carolina
  in Utica, New York
  in Bunn, North Carolina
 WFZZ in Seymour, Wisconsin
  in Greenwood, Mississippi
 WGSX in Lynn Haven, Florida
  in Luverne, Alabama
 WJKS in Keeseville, New York
  in Hamlet, North Carolina
  in Harrisonburg, Virginia
 WKNT-LP in Kingston, Tennessee
 WKZM in Sarasota, Florida
 WLEG-LP in Goshen, Indiana
 WLPL-LP in Dixon, Illinois
  in Bude, Mississippi
 WNAE in Clarendon, Pennsylvania
  in Harrison, Ohio
  in Richwood, Ohio
 WOGI in Moon Township, Pennsylvania
 WOMC in Detroit, Michigan
 WPBP-LP in Brandon, Mississippi
 WPWS-LP in Piney Woods, Mississippi
  in Fletcher, North Carolina
 WRDS-LP in Roscommon, Michigan
 WRJJ in La Center, Kentucky
 WRRS-LP in Pittsfield, Massachusetts
 WSFS in Miramar, Florida
  in Everett, Pennsylvania
 WULL-LP in Ivydale, West Virginia
  in Baraga, Michigan
 WWPG in Eutaw, Alabama
 WXBC (FM) in Hardinsburg, Kentucky
 WXZC in Inglis, Florida
  in Baltimore, Maryland
  in Charlotte Amalie, Virgin Islands
  in Dahlonega, Georgia
  in Athens, Alabama

References

Lists of radio stations by frequency